Episcepsis capyscoides is a moth of the family Erebidae. It was described by Paul Dognin in 1911. It is found in French Guiana.

References

External links
E. capyscoides at EOL

Euchromiina
Moths described in 1911